Naturally occurring gadolinium (64Gd) is composed of 6 stable isotopes, 154Gd, 155Gd, 156Gd, 157Gd, 158Gd and 160Gd, and 1 radioisotope, 152Gd, with 158Gd being the most abundant (24.84% natural abundance). The predicted double beta decay of 160Gd has never been observed; only a lower limit on its half-life of more than 1.3×1021 years has been set experimentally.

Thirty-three radioisotopes have been characterized, with the most stable being alpha-decaying 152Gd (naturally occurring) with a half-life of 1.08×1014 years, and 150Gd with a half-life of 1.79×106 years. All of the remaining radioactive isotopes have half-lives less than 74.7 years. The majority of these have half-lives less than 24.6 seconds. Gadolinium isotopes have 10 metastable isomers, with the most stable being 143mGd (t1/2 = 110 seconds), 145mGd (t1/2 = 85 seconds) and 141mGd (t1/2 = 24.5 seconds).

The primary decay mode at atomic weights lower than the most abundant stable isotope, 158Gd, is electron capture, and the primary mode at higher atomic weights is beta decay. The primary decay products for isotopes lighter than 158Gd are isotopes of europium and the primary products of heavier isotopes are isotopes of terbium.

Gadolinium-153 has a half-life of 240.4 ± 10 days and emits gamma radiation with strong peaks at 41 keV and 102 keV. It is used as a gamma ray source for X-ray absorptiometry and fluorescence, for bone density gauges for osteoporosis screening, and for radiometric profiling in the Lixiscope portable x-ray imaging system, also known as the Lixi Profiler. In nuclear medicine, it serves to calibrate the equipment needed like single-photon emission computed tomography systems (SPECT) to make x-rays. It ensures that the machines work correctly to produce images of radioisotope distribution inside the patient. This isotope is produced in a nuclear reactor from europium or enriched gadolinium. It can also detect the loss of calcium in the hip and back bones, allowing the ability to diagnose osteoporosis.

Gadolinium-148 would be ideal for radioisotope thermoelectric generators due to its 74-year half-life, high density, and dominant alpha decay mode. However, gadolinium-148 cannot be economically synthesized in sufficient quantities to power a RTG.

List of isotopes 

|-
| 134Gd
| style="text-align:right" | 64
| style="text-align:right" | 70
| 133.95537(43)#
| 0.4# s
|
|
| 0+
|
|
|-
| 135Gd
| style="text-align:right" | 64
| style="text-align:right" | 71
| 134.95257(54)#
| 1.1(2) s
|
|
| 3/2−
|
|
|-
| 136Gd
| style="text-align:right" | 64
| style="text-align:right" | 72
| 135.94734(43)#
| 1# s [>200 ns]
| β+
| 136Eu
|
|
|
|-
| rowspan=2|137Gd
| rowspan=2 style="text-align:right" | 64
| rowspan=2 style="text-align:right" | 73
| rowspan=2|136.94502(43)#
| rowspan=2|2.2(2) s
| β+
| 137Eu
| rowspan=2|7/2+#
| rowspan=2|
| rowspan=2|
|-
| β+, p (rare)
| 136Sm
|-
| 138Gd
| style="text-align:right" | 64
| style="text-align:right" | 74
| 137.94012(21)#
| 4.7(9) s
| β+
| 138Eu
| 0+
|
|
|-
| style="text-indent:1em" | 138mGd
| colspan="3" style="text-indent:2em" | 2232.7(11) keV
| 6(1) µs
|
|
| (8−)
|
|
|-
| rowspan=2|139Gd
| rowspan=2 style="text-align:right" | 64
| rowspan=2 style="text-align:right" | 75
| rowspan=2|138.93824(21)#
| rowspan=2|5.7(3) s
| β+
| 139Eu
| rowspan=2|9/2−#
| rowspan=2|
| rowspan=2|
|-
| β+, p (rare)
| 138Sm
|-
| style="text-indent:1em" | 139mGd
| colspan="3" style="text-indent:2em" | 250(150)# keV
| 4.8(9) s
|
|
| 1/2+#
|
|
|-
| 140Gd
| style="text-align:right" | 64
| style="text-align:right" | 76
| 139.93367(3)
| 15.8(4) s
| β+
| 140Eu
| 0+
|
|
|-
| rowspan=2|141Gd
| rowspan=2 style="text-align:right" | 64
| rowspan=2 style="text-align:right" | 77
| rowspan=2|140.932126(21)
| rowspan=2|14(4) s
| β+ (99.97%)
| 141Eu
| rowspan=2|(1/2+)
| rowspan=2|
| rowspan=2|
|-
| β+, p (.03%)
| 140Sm
|-
| rowspan=2 style="text-indent:1em" | 141mGd
| rowspan=2 colspan="3" style="text-indent:2em" | 377.8(2) keV
| rowspan=2|24.5(5) s
| β+ (89%)
| 141Eu
| rowspan=2|(11/2−)
| rowspan=2|
| rowspan=2|
|-
| IT (11%)
| 141Gd
|-
| 142Gd
| style="text-align:right" | 64
| style="text-align:right" | 78
| 141.92812(3)
| 70.2(6) s
| β+
| 142Eu
| 0+
|
|
|-
| rowspan=3|143Gd
| rowspan=3 style="text-align:right" | 64
| rowspan=3 style="text-align:right" | 79
| rowspan=3|142.92675(22)
| rowspan=3|39(2) s
| β+
| 143Eu
| rowspan=3|(1/2)+
| rowspan=3|
| rowspan=3|
|-
| β+, α (rare)
| 139Pm
|-
| β+, p (rare)
| 142Sm
|-
| rowspan=3 style="text-indent:1em" | 143mGd
| rowspan=3 colspan="3" style="text-indent:2em" | 152.6(5) keV
| rowspan=3|110.0(14) s
| β+
| 143Eu
| rowspan=3|(11/2−)
| rowspan=3|
| rowspan=3|
|-
| β+, α (rare)
| 139Pm
|-
| β+, p (rare)
| 142Sm
|-
| 144Gd
| style="text-align:right" | 64
| style="text-align:right" | 80
| 143.92296(3)
| 4.47(6) min
| β+
| 144Eu
| 0+
|
|
|-
| 145Gd
| style="text-align:right" | 64
| style="text-align:right" | 81
| 144.921709(20)
| 23.0(4) min
| β+
| 145Eu
| 1/2+
|
|
|-
| rowspan=2 style="text-indent:1em" | 145mGd
| rowspan=2 colspan="3" style="text-indent:2em" | 749.1(2) keV
| rowspan=2|85(3) s
| IT (94.3%)
| 145Gd
| rowspan=2|11/2−
| rowspan=2|
| rowspan=2|
|-
| β+ (5.7%)
| 145Eu
|-
| 146Gd
| style="text-align:right" | 64
| style="text-align:right" | 82
| 145.918311(5)
| 48.27(10) d
| EC
| 146Eu
| 0+
|
|
|-
| 147Gd
| style="text-align:right" | 64
| style="text-align:right" | 83
| 146.919094(3)
| 38.06(12) h
| β+
| 147Eu
| 7/2−
|
|
|-
| style="text-indent:1em" | 147mGd
| colspan="3" style="text-indent:2em" | 8587.8(4) keV
| 510(20) ns
|
|
| (49/2+)
|
|
|-
| rowspan=2|148Gd
| rowspan=2 style="text-align:right" | 64
| rowspan=2 style="text-align:right" | 84
| rowspan=2|147.918115(3)
| rowspan=2|74.6(30) y
| α
| 144Sm
| rowspan=2|0+
| rowspan=2|
| rowspan=2|
|-
| β+β+ (rare)
| 148Sm
|-
| rowspan=2|149Gd
| rowspan=2 style="text-align:right" | 64
| rowspan=2 style="text-align:right" | 85
| rowspan=2|148.919341(4)
| rowspan=2|9.28(10) d
| β+
| 149Eu
| rowspan=2|7/2−
| rowspan=2|
| rowspan=2|
|-
| α (4.34×10−4%)
| 145Sm
|-
| rowspan=2|150Gd
| rowspan=2 style="text-align:right" | 64
| rowspan=2 style="text-align:right" | 86
| rowspan=2|149.918659(7)
| rowspan=2|1.79(8)×106 y
| α
| 146Sm
| rowspan=2|0+
| rowspan=2|
| rowspan=2|
|-
| β+β+ (rare)
| 150Sm
|-
| rowspan=2|151Gd
| rowspan=2 style="text-align:right" | 64
| rowspan=2 style="text-align:right" | 87
| rowspan=2|150.920348(4)
| rowspan=2|124(1) d
| EC
| 151Eu
| rowspan=2|7/2−
| rowspan=2|
| rowspan=2|
|-
| α (10−6%)
| 147Sm
|-
| 152Gd
| style="text-align:right" | 64
| style="text-align:right" | 88
| 151.9197910(27)
| 1.08(8)×1014 y
| α
| 148Sm
| 0+
| 0.0020(1)
|
|-
| 153Gd
| style="text-align:right" | 64
| style="text-align:right" | 89
| 152.9217495(27)
| 240.4(10) d
| EC
| 153Eu
| 3/2−
|
|
|-
| style="text-indent:1em" | 153m1Gd
| colspan="3" style="text-indent:2em" | 95.1737(12) keV
| 3.5(4) µs
|
|
| (9/2+)
|
|
|-
| style="text-indent:1em" | 153m2Gd
| colspan="3" style="text-indent:2em" | 171.189(5) keV
| 76.0(14) µs
|
|
| (11/2−)
|
|
|-
| 154Gd
| style="text-align:right" | 64
| style="text-align:right" | 90
| 153.9208656(27)
| colspan="3" style="text-align:center;"|Observationally Stable
| 0+
| 0.0218(3)
|
|-
| 155Gd
| style="text-align:right" | 64
| style="text-align:right" | 91
| 154.9226220(27)
| colspan="3" style="text-align:center;"|Observationally Stable
| 3/2−
| 0.1480(12)
|
|-
| style="text-indent:1em" | 155mGd
| colspan="3" style="text-indent:2em" | 121.05(19) keV
| 31.97(27) ms
| IT
| 155Gd
| 11/2−
|
|
|-
| 156Gd
| style="text-align:right" | 64
| style="text-align:right" | 92
| 155.9221227(27)
| colspan="3" style="text-align:center;"|Stable
| 0+
| 0.2047(9)
|
|-
| style="text-indent:1em" | 156mGd
| colspan="3" style="text-indent:2em" | 2137.60(5) keV
| 1.3(1) µs
|
|
| 7-
|
|
|-
| 157Gd
| style="text-align:right" | 64
| style="text-align:right" | 93
| 156.9239601(27)
| colspan="3" style="text-align:center;"|Stable
| 3/2−
| 0.1565(2)
|
|-
| 158Gd
| style="text-align:right" | 64
| style="text-align:right" | 94
| 157.9241039(27)
| colspan="3" style="text-align:center;"|Stable
| 0+
| 0.2484(7)
|
|-
| 159Gd
| style="text-align:right" | 64
| style="text-align:right" | 95
| 158.9263887(27)
| 18.479(4) h
| β−
| 159Tb
| 3/2−
|
|
|-
| 160Gd
| style="text-align:right" | 64
| style="text-align:right" | 96
| 159.9270541(27)
| colspan="3" style="text-align:center;"|Observationally Stable
| 0+
| 0.2186(19)
|
|-
| 161Gd
| style="text-align:right" | 64
| style="text-align:right" | 97
| 160.9296692(29)
| 3.646(3) min
| β−
| 161Tb
| 5/2−
|
|
|-
| 162Gd
| style="text-align:right" | 64
| style="text-align:right" | 98
| 161.930985(5)
| 8.4(2) min
| β−
| 162Tb
| 0+
|
|
|-
| 163Gd
| style="text-align:right" | 64
| style="text-align:right" | 99
| 162.93399(32)#
| 68(3) s
| β−
| 163Tb
| 7/2+#
|
|
|-
| 164Gd
| style="text-align:right" | 64
| style="text-align:right" | 100
| 163.93586(43)#
| 45(3) s
| β−
| 164Tb
| 0+
|
|
|-
| 165Gd
| style="text-align:right" | 64
| style="text-align:right" | 101
| 164.93938(54)#
| 10.3(16) s
| β−
| 165Tb
| 1/2−#
|
|
|-
| 166Gd
| style="text-align:right" | 64
| style="text-align:right" | 102
| 165.94160(64)#
| 4.8(10) s
| β−
| 166Tb
| 0+
|
|
|-
| 167Gd
| style="text-align:right" | 64
| style="text-align:right" | 103
| 166.94557(64)#
| 4.2(3) s
| β−
| 167Tb
| 5/2−#
|
|
|-
| 168Gd
| style="text-align:right" | 64
| style="text-align:right" | 104
| 167.94836(75)#
| 3.03(16) s
| β−
| 168Tb
| 0+
|
|
|-
| 169Gd
| style="text-align:right" | 64
| style="text-align:right" | 105
| 168.95287(86)#
| 750(210) ms
| β−
| 169Tb
| 7/2−#
|
|
|-
| 170Gd
| style="text-align:right" | 64
| style="text-align:right" | 106
| 
| 
| β−
| 170Tb
| 0+
|
|
|-
| 171Gd
| style="text-align:right" | 64
| style="text-align:right" | 107
| 
| 
| β−
| 171Tb
| 
|
|
|-
| 172Gd
| style="text-align:right" | 64
| style="text-align:right" | 108
| 
| 
| β−
| 172Tb
| 0+
|
|

References 

 Isotope masses from:
 
 Isotopic compositions and standard atomic masses from:
 
 
 Half-life, spin, and isomer data selected from the following sources.
 
 
 

 
Gadolinium
Gadolinium